Pullulanase (limit dextrinase, amylopectin 6-glucanohydrolase, bacterial debranching enzyme, debranching enzyme, alpha-dextrin endo-1,6-alpha-glucosidase, R-enzyme, pullulan alpha-1,6-glucanohydrolase) is a specific kind of glucanase, an amylolytic exoenzyme, that degrades pullulan. It is produced as an extracellular, cell surface-anchored lipoprotein by Gram-negative bacteria of the genus Klebsiella. Type I pullulanases specifically attack α-1,6 linkages, while type II pullulanases are also able to hydrolyse α-1,4 linkages. It is also produced by some other bacteria and archaea. Pullulanase is used as a processing aid in grain processing biotechnology (production of ethanol and sweeteners).

Pullulanase is also known as pullulan-6-glucanohydrolase (Debranching enzyme). Its substrate, pullulan, is regarded as a chain of maltotriose units linked by alpha-1,6-glycosidic bonds. Pullulanase will hydrolytically cleave pullulan (alpha-glucan polysaccharides).

References

External links

EC 3.2.1